Epermenia insularis is a moth in the family Epermeniidae. It was described by Reinhard Gaedike in 1979. It is found on Norfolk Island between Australia and New Zealand.

References

Epermeniidae
Moths described in 1979
Moths of Oceania